The Lauca Hydroelectric Power Station is a  hydroelectric power plant, under construction in Angola. Completed in 2020, it is the largest power station in the country.

Location
The power station sits across the Kwanza River at the border between Angola's Cuanza Norte Province and Malanje Province. The geographical coordinates of Laúca Hydroelectric Power Station are:09°44'22.0"S, 15°07'33.0"E (Latitude:-9.739444; Longitude:15.125833).

Overview
Construction of the biggest hydroelectric power installation in Angola began in 2012. The first 338 megawatts generator of the 2,070 megawatts power station was commissioned on 4 August 2017, when the power plant was officially inaugurated by President José Eduardo dos Santos, the president of Angola at that time. In July 2019, the fifth turbine, out of six main generating units, was installed.

The power generated is integrated into the national electricity grid and supplies energy to approximately 8,000,000 customers in 
Angola. The project has provided over 8,000 direct jobs during the construction phase.

Technical specifications

The reservoir will supply two hydroelectric power stations, a main and an ancillary. The main will contain six 338 MW Francis turbine-generators and the ancillary a single 42 MW Francis unit. The ancillary power station will operate most often, to maintain a minimum  ecological flow of the river.

Later, the specifications were modified to six 338 megawatts generators for the main and one 42 megawatts generator for the ancillary.

Funding
The dam and power station will cost US$4.3 billion. In the beginning the project received partial funding from the government of Brazil. Following a corruption scandal involving the government of Brazil in 2016, that line of credit was terminated, leaving a funding gap. The government  of Angola turned to commercial lenders in order to raise the necessary funding to complete the project. The table below illustrates the sources of funding for the Laúca Hydroelectric Power Station.

See also
 List of power stations in Angola

References

External links
Malanje: President Unveils Lauca Dam As of 4 August 2017.

Dams in Angola
Power stations in Angola
Hydroelectric power stations in Angola
Dams on the Cuanza River
Roller-compacted concrete dams
Gravity dams